There are at least 27 named mountains in Broadwater County, Montana.
 Avalanche Butte, el. 
 Big Mountain, el. 
 Bilk Mountain, el. 
 Black Butte, el. 
 Black Butte, el. 
 Boulder Baldy, el. 
 Boulder Mountain, el. 
 Cayuse Mountain, el. 
 Cedar Hill, el. 
 Chewh-toowh-too-peh Hill, el. 
 Dutchie Butte, el. 
 Frenchman Hill, el. 
 Giant Hill, el. 
 Glendale Butte, el. 
 Grassy Mountain, el. 
 High Peak, el. 
 Hooligans Hill, el. 
 Lombard Hill, el. 
 Lone Mountain, el. 
 Mount Baldy, el. 
 Mount Edith, el. 
 Needham Mountain, el. 
 Pilot Knob, el. 
 Sherlock Mountain, el. 
 Sixmile Mountain, el. 
 The Buttes, el. 
 Wall Mountain, el.

See also
 List of mountains in Montana
 List of mountain ranges in Montana

Notes

Landforms of Broadwater County, Montana
Broadwater